Little Joy is the self-titled debut album by Brazilian/American rock band Little Joy. It was released on November 4, 2008.

Track listing

Personnel 
 Fabrizio Moretti – guitar, tenor guitar, piano, bass guitar, drums, percussion, melodica, backing vocals
 Binki Shapiro – vocals, guitar, glockenspiel, percussion, backing vocals
 Rodrigo Amarante – vocals, guitar, piano, bass, ukulele, organ, Mellotron, percussion, backing vocals

Additional Personnel
Andrew Balogh – baritone saxophone
Samuel Pannell – tenor horn
Ryan Duffy – violin
Alison Lowell – oboe
Maciej Sflif – bassoon
Brendan Speltz – violin
David Tuohy – backing vocals on "With Strangers"
Keegan Wood – trombone
Wen Yee – viola
Amy Tatum – flute
Loribeth Capella – backing vocals on "With Strangers"
Mia Barcia-Colombo – cello
Adam Green – backing vocals on "With Strangers"
Andy Leonard – clarinet
Nick Valensi – backing vocals on "With Strangers"
Noah Georgeson – guitar, slide guitar, backing vocals on "Brand New Start", "No One's Better Sake", and "Keep Me in Mind"; mixing, production
Mia Barcia Colombo – cello
Mike Davis – trumpet, contractor
Carlos Zetino – backing vocals, ambience
Devendra Banhart – additional vocals on "Don't Watch Me Dancing"

References

2008 debut albums
Little Joy albums
Rough Trade Records albums
Albums produced by Noah Georgeson
Albums produced by Thom Monahan